Mae Ukho is a village and tambon (sub-district) of Khun Yuam District, in Mae Hong Son Province, Thailand. In 2005 it had a population of 3,283 people. The tambon contains six villages.

References

Tambon of Mae Hong Son province
Populated places in Mae Hong Son province